Young Mrs. Winthrop is a lost 1920 American silent drama film starring Ethel Clayton. It is based on the 1882 Victorian era Broadway play by Bronson Howard. The film was produced by Famous Players-Lasky and distributed by Paramount Pictures.

Plot
As described in a film magazine, Constance Winthrop (Clayton) and her husband Douglas (Ford) have drifted apart through her devotion to social events and his work. The birthday of their five-year-old child draws them together and they plan to drop their outside engagements and devote the day to little Rosie (Marsh). However, Mrs. Dunbar (Van Buren), an eavesdropping neighbor, after overhearing a message on a party line, has her maid impersonate Mrs. Winthrop and telephone Mr. Winthrop to not come home as she has changed her mind about the party and is going out. Douglas, deeply hurt, stops by Mrs. Dunbar's house on business and is seen by his wife. Thinking that she has been deceived, Constance rushes off to a Jazz party. That evening the child Rosie contracts membranous croup and dies. When Constance arrives home late that night, Douglas refuses to let her into the room, and she says "I am a thousand times more fit to be with her than you." The two drift further apart and, upon the verge of a formal separation, the old family lawyer skillfully plays upon their feelings that a reunification results.

Cast
Ethel Clayton as Constance Winthrop
Harrison Ford as Douglas Winthrop
Helen Dunbar as Old Mrs. Winthrop
Joan Marsh as Rosie (credited as Dorothy Rosher)
Winifred Greenwood as Mrs. Dick Chetwyn
J. M. Dumont as Dick Rodney
Charles Ogle as Buxton Scott
Raymond Hatton as Nick Jones
Mabel Van Buren as Mrs. Dunbar
Viora Daniel as Janet
Walter Hiers as Dick Chetwyn
Rex Zane as Bob

References

External links

 

1920 films
American silent feature films
American films based on plays
Lost American films
Paramount Pictures films
1920 drama films
Silent American drama films
Films directed by Walter Edwards
American black-and-white films
1920 lost films
Lost drama films
1920s American films
1920s English-language films